The Lake District Boat Club is a sailing club, situated at Glebe Road, Bowness-on-Windermere, Cumbria, England. The Club is family orientated and is open to all (owning a boat is not essential). The LDBC also run a full programme of both social and racing events.

References

External links 
 Homepage of the Lake District Boat Club

Organisations based in Cumbria
Sport in Cumbria
Yacht clubs in England
Windermere, Cumbria